Michele Troiani (born 21 July 1996) is an Italian football player.

Club career

ChievoVerona

Loan to Benevento 
On 26 August 2015, Troiani was loaned to Serie C side Benevento on a season-long loan deal. On 13 September he made his professional debut in Serie C for Benevento as a substitute replacing  Francesco Mazzarani in the 80th minute of a 1–1 away draw against Lupa Castelli Romani. On 23 September he played his first entire match for Benevento, a 0–0 home draw against Messina. On 2 April 2016 he scored his first professional goal in 62nd minute of a 3–2 home win over Ischia. Troiani ended his season-long loan to Benevento with 19 appearances and 1 goal, he also helps the team to win the Serie C title.

Loan to Triestina 
After spend all the 2016–17 as an unused substitute for ChievoVerona, on 17 August 2017, Troiani was signed by Serie C club Triestina on a season-long loan deal. On 3 September he made his debut for Triestina in Serie C in a 1–1 home draw against Reggiana, he played the entire match. On 5 November he scored his first goal for Triestina in the 50th minute and the second after 22 minutes, in the 72nd minute of a 4–2 away win over Pordenone. Troiani ended his season-long loan to Triestina win 17 appearances, 12 as a starter and 2 goals.

Loan to Piacenza 
On 13 July 2018, Troiani was loaned to Serie C club Piacenza on a season-long loan deal. On 29 July he made his debut for Piacenza as a substitute replacing Cristian Cauz in the 91st minute, but he was sent off with a double yellow card in the 107th minute of a match loss 5–3 at penalties after a 1–1 away draw against Monopoli in the first round of Coppa Italia. On 26 September he made his Serie C debut for Piacenza in a 4–3 away win over Gozzano, he played the entire match. On 17 October, Troiani was sent-off for the second time this season with a double yellow card in the 58th minute of a 2–1 home win over Carrarese. On 5 November he played his first entire match for Piacenza in Serie C, 2–0 away win over Juventus U23. One week later he scored his first goal in the 15th minute of a 3–1 home win over Pro Piacenza. On 9 December he scored his second goal in the 67th minute of a 3–1 home win over Arzachena.

Career statistics

Club

Honours

Club 
ChievoVerona Primavera

 Campionato Nazionale Primavera: 2013–14

Torino Primavera

 Campionato Nazionale Primavera: 2014–15

Benevento

 Serie C: 2015–16

References

External links
 

1996 births
Footballers from Verona
Living people
Italian footballers
Association football defenders
Italy youth international footballers
A.C. ChievoVerona players
Benevento Calcio players
U.S. Triestina Calcio 1918 players
Piacenza Calcio 1919 players
Serie C players